Adonis Santa Maria (born January 20, 1979) is a Filipino former Philippine Basketball Association player. He was drafted 13th overall by Shell in 2003. He also played for the Sta. Lucia Realtors, Welcoat Dragons, and Air21 Express and the Barako Bull Energy Boosters during his PBA stint.

Player Profile
Santa Maria played for coach Leo Austria in the Shell Turbo Chargers. He played 34 games in the 2007 season for the Welcoat Dragons and averaged 5.1 points per game and 4.9 rebounds per game. He was signed by the Air21 Express in 2008 but was later released by the team. In the middle of the 2009-10 PBA Philippine Cup, he was signed by the Barako Bull Energy Boosters.

References

External links
Player Profile
PBA-Online! Profile

1979 births
Barako Bull Energy players
Filipino men's basketball players
Living people
Rain or Shine Elasto Painters players
De La Salle Green Archers basketball players
People from Isabela (province)
Basketball players from Isabela (province)
Centers (basketball)
Shell Turbo Chargers players
Sta. Lucia Realtors players
Barako Bull Energy Boosters players
Ilocano people
Sta. Lucia Realtors draft picks